The Dr. Martin Walton House is a historic house near Springfield, Tennessee, U.S..

History
The house was built in 1809 for Dr. Martin Walton, a veteran of the American Revolutionary War, his wife Elizabeth and their five children. Walton was a physician, Baptist minister, and large landowner who grew corn and cotton; he also made whiskey.  Walton died in 1844, and his son David was murdered by two slaves a year later. The house was purchased by William Pope in 1845.

The house was purchased by William Cook, a veteran of the Confederate States Army during the American Civil War, and his wife Susan, in 1866. It was redesigned in the Italianate architectural style in 1870. It was listed on the National Register of Historic Places in 1996.

References

Houses on the National Register of Historic Places in Tennessee
Italianate architecture in Tennessee
Houses completed in 1809
Buildings and structures in Robertson County, Tennessee